Lena Blomkvist (born 19 October 1990) is a Swedish football defender who played for Piteå IF in the Damallsvenskan.

References

External links
   
  
 
 
 

1990 births
Living people
Swedish women's footballers
Damallsvenskan players
Piteå IF (women) players
Women's association football defenders
People from Piteå Municipality
Sportspeople from Norrbotten County